Maung (Mawung, Mawng, Gun-marung) is an Australian aboriginal language spoken by the Maung people on the Goulburn Islands, off the north coast of Arnhem Land, in the Northern Territory of Australia. Maung is closely related to Iwaidja language which occupies the northwestern corner of the opposite mainland. This is a language that belongs to the Iwaidjan language family of Non-Pama–Nyungan languages.  As of 2021, there were around 360 speakers of the language.

Study of Maung has developed to the point where a dictionary, grammar and portions of the Bible are available. Maung is taught in local schools alongside English and other languages such as Iwaidja or Kunwinjku. Children are still acquiring it as a first language, making it somewhat healthier than most other aboriginal languages.

Phonology 

The phonemic inventories provided here are from Capell's well-known 1970 work on Maung. More recent papers (Singer 2006; Teo 2007) have only two rhotics to Capell's three. Teo lacks the alveolar flap, and Singer the retroflex flap. (In a minor difference, both describe the approximant as retroflex, whereas Capell describes it as alveolar.)

Grammar
Maung has five grammatical genders: masculine, feminine, vegetation, land, and edible.

Alternative names
 Kunmarung (Kunwinjku exonym).

References

Iwaidjan languages